The Ozmer House is a historic house on the Southern Arkansas University farm on the north side of Magnolia, Arkansas.  It is a single-story dogtrot house that was built in 1883 and moved to its present location by the school.  It was originally located about two miles northeast of Magnolia's courthouse square, and is now located northeast of the main farm complex, adjacent to a small pond.  The dogtrot is extremely well-preserved, both in its interior and exterior features.

The house was listed on the National Register of Historic Places in 1986.

See also
National Register of Historic Places listings in Columbia County, Arkansas

References

Houses on the National Register of Historic Places in Arkansas
Houses completed in 1883
Houses in Columbia County, Arkansas
Southern Arkansas University
National Register of Historic Places in Columbia County, Arkansas
1883 establishments in Arkansas
Dogtrot architecture in Arkansas
Relocated buildings and structures in Arkansas